Myurella conspersa is a species of sea snail, a marine gastropod mollusk in the family Terebridae, the auger snails.

Description
The length of the shell varies between 25 mm and 53 mm

Distribution
This marine species occurs off the Philippines, China, Papua New Guinea and the Fiji Islands.

References

External links
 Hinds R.B. (1844). Descriptions of new shells, collected during the voyage of the Sulphur, and in Mr. Cuming's late visit to the Philippines. Proceedings of the Zoological Society of London. 11 (1844): 149–168
 Deshayes G.P. (1857). Description d'espèces nouvelles du genre Terebra. Journal de Conchyliologie. 6(1): 65-102.
 Deshayes G.P. (1859). A general review of the genus Terebra, and a description of new species. Proceedings of the Zoological Society of London. 27: 270-321
 Fedosov, A. E.; Malcolm, G.; Terryn, Y.; Gorson, J.; Modica, M. V.; Holford, M.; Puillandre, N. (2020). Phylogenetic classification of the family Terebridae (Neogastropoda: Conoidea). Journal of Molluscan Studies

Terebridae
Gastropods described in 1844